Cedar Slope is a census-designated place (CDP) in Tulare County, California. The 2010 United States census reported that Cedar Slope was uninhabited. Cedar Slope can be reached from Porterville by 37 curvy miles  on California State Route 190 with an elevation gain of 5,525  feet.

Geography 
According to the United States Census Bureau, the CDP covers an area of 0.7 square miles (1.8 km), all of it land.

Demographics

History 

The first occupant of Cedar Slope was the artist and seamstress Nellie Marshall in 1881. Nearby Marshall Creek is named after her. In 1945, 80 acres of the original homestead were purchased and developed by Les and Ruth Bailey and Fred and Hazelyn Hopkins. Tulare County approved this 80-acre expanse as Tract 119 in 1947, authorizing the construction of the area's first cabins. Many of the first wave of cabins were built by World War Two veterans.  The community owned Cedar Slope Mutual Water Company, established in 1947, provides and manages water to the development. Carl and Lynn Tapia rebuilt the Cedar Slope Inn after the original store on that site on Highway 190 burned down in the late 1960s. The couple ran it as a community bar and music venue until Carl suffered his first stroke in 1997. Afterwards the property passed into other hands.  The Cedar Slope Inn suffered no meaningful damage during the Sequoia Complex Fire (SQF Complex).

Sequoia Complex Fire 

In September, 2020, Cedar Slope was largely destroyed by the naturally sparked Sequoia Complex Fire. 57 of the 65 cabins were completely burned. In the nearby communities of Alpine Village and Sequoia Crest, 37 and 49 cabins were lost in the fire, respectively. The McIntrye Grove of Giant Sequoia, a short distance to the south from Cedar Slope, is reported as heavily damaged by SQF Fire. The area remains at risk for mud flows and flash floods due to the charred soil being unable to absorb water.

References

Census-designated places in Tulare County, California
Census-designated places in California